Ján Sýkora (born September 14, 1990) is a Slovak professional ice hockey player. He is currently playing for HC 21 Prešov of the Slovak Extraliga. 

Sýkora made his Czech Extraliga debut playing with HC Plzeň during the 2013-14 Czech Extraliga season.

Career statistics

Regular season and playoffs

References

External links

1990 births
Living people
BK Havlíčkův Brod players
HC '05 Banská Bystrica players
HC 07 Detva players
HC Dynamo Pardubice players
HC Frýdek-Místek players
HC Košice players
HC Oceláři Třinec players
HC Plzeň players
HC 21 Prešov players
People from Detva District
Sportspeople from the Banská Bystrica Region
Slovak expatriate ice hockey players in the Czech Republic